Elizabeth Ann Regosin (born 1967) is an American historian who is the Charles A. Dana Professor of History at St. Lawrence University. She researches African-American history with a focus on emancipation and the Reconstruction era. Regosin has written two books on the topic, Freedom's Promise (2002) and Voices of Emancipation (2008).

Early life and education 
Regosin was raised in Irvine, California and has 2 sisters. She earned a B.A. in history at University of California, Berkeley in 1989. She worked as a teaching assistant from 1990 to 1991 while completing a M.A. in history at University of California, Irvine in 1992. Regosin earned a Ph.D. in history at Irvine in 1995. Her dissertation was titled Slave Custom and White Law: Ex-Slave Families and the Civil War Pension System, 1865-1900. Regosin's doctoral advisor was Michael P. Johnson.

Career 
Regosin's main research interest is African American history with a focus on African Americans transitioning out of slavery. She has written 2 books about emancipation  and the Reconstruction era. Regosin joined the faculty at St. Lawrence University in 1997 and teaches courses in U.S. history, African American history, and the history of women in the U.S. She is the Charles A. Dana Professor of History. Regosin teaches a community-based learning course with students from both St. Lawrence University and Riverview Correctional Facility.

Selected works

References 

Living people
1967 births
Place of birth missing (living people)
American women historians
People from Irvine, California
University of California, Irvine alumni
University of California, Berkeley alumni
St. Lawrence University faculty
21st-century American women writers
21st-century American historians
Historians from California
Historians of African Americans
Historians of the American Civil War
Historians from New York (state)